Juan Esteban Godoy (born 5 January 1982) is a Paraguayan footballer.

He played for River Plate de Paraguay.

References
 Profile at BDFA 
 

1982 births
Living people
Sportspeople from Asunción
Paraguayan footballers
Paraguayan expatriate footballers
Club Rubio Ñu footballers
12 de Octubre Football Club players
Club Sol de América footballers
Sportivo Luqueño players
Sportivo Trinidense footballers
River Plate (Asunción) footballers
General Caballero Sport Club footballers
C.D. Antofagasta footballers
Everton de Viña del Mar footballers
Expatriate footballers in Chile
Association football forwards